The women's rhythmic group 5 balls competition at the 2019 European Games was held at the Minsk-Arena on 23 June 2019.

Results

References 

Women's rhythmic group 5 balls